F. A. Turner (October 12, 1858 – February 13, 1923) was an American actor of the stage and of the silent era. He appeared in more than 60 films between 1914 and 1922. He was born in New York City. He is sometimes billed as Fred Turner.

Partial filmography

 The Hunchback (1914, Short) - A Hunchback Peddler
 The Quicksands (1914, Short)
 The Life of General Villa (1914) - American girl's father
 Home, Sweet Home (1914)
 The Escape (1914) - Jim Joyce
 The Next in Command (1914) - Pvt. Nolan
 The Lost House (1915, Short) - Dosia's Uncle
 A Man and His Mate (1915) - The Colonel - Betty's Father
 The Outlaw's Revenge (1915) - The American Girl's Father
 The Living Death (1915, Short) - Dr. Farrell
 The Burned Hand (1915, Short)
 The Woman from Warren's (1915, Short) - Fred Thompson
 The Penitentes (1915) - Father Rossi
 Acquitted (1916) - Police Captain
 Little Meena's Romance (1916) - Meena's Uncle
 Susan Rocks the Boat (1916) - Jasper Thornton
 The Devil's Needle (1916) - Marshall Devon
 Intolerance (1916) - The Dear One's Father
 Atta Boy's Last Race (1916) - Phil Strong
 The Microscope Mystery (1916) - Ira Dayton
 The Children of the Feud (1916) - Judge Lee Cavanagh
 The Little Yank (1917) - Wilson Carver
 A Girl of the Timber Claims (1917) - Jess's Father
 A Love Sublime (1917) - The Professor
 Her Official Fathers (1917) - John Webster
 Madame Bo-Peep (1917) - Colonel Beaupree
 Rebecca of Sunnybrook Farm (1917) - Mr. Simpson
 Aladdin and the Wonderful Lamp (1917) - Mustapha - the Tailor
 Restitution (1918) - Herod
 The Love Swindle (1918) - Minor Role (uncredited)
 Playthings (1918) - Jim Carter
 The Velvet Hand (1918) - Russo Russelli
 She Hired a Husband (1918) - Colonel Dunstan
 The Heart of Wetona (1919) - Pastor David Wells
 As the Sun Went Down (1919) - Gerald Morton
 The Mother and the Law (1919) - The Girl's Father
 The Miracle Man (1919) - Mr. Higgins
 Bonnie Bonnie Lassie (1919)
 Peg o' My Heart (1919)
 Terror Island (1920) - Mr. West
 The Jack-Knife Man (1920) - Peter Lane
 Eyes of the Heart (1920) - Dr. Dewey
 The Furnace (1920) - Albert Vallance
 The Witching Hour (1921) - Lew Ellinger
 Tropical Love (1921) - The Seeker
 Through a Glass Window (1922) - Matt Clancy

References

External links

1858 births
1923 deaths
American male silent film actors
Male actors from New York (state)
20th-century American male actors